Aegon N.V. (stylized as AEGON) is a Dutch public company for life insurance, pensions and asset management. It is headquartered in The Hague, Netherlands and has 26,000 employees as of July 21, 2020. Aegon is listed on the Euronext Amsterdam and is a constituent of the AEX index. It operates a direct bank under the brand name "Knab" in the Netherlands.

History
Aegon was founded in 1983 from the merger of AGO Holding N.V. (created by the merger of Algemeene Friesche, Groot-Noordhollandsche and Olveh (Onderlinge Verzekeringsmaatschappij Eigen Hulp) in 1968) and Ennia N.V. (formed by the merger of Eerste Nederlandsche and Nillmij (Nederlandsch-Indische Levensverzekering- en Lijfrente-Maatschappij) in 1969).

Aegon acquired Scottish Equitable in 1994. In 1998 it formed Stonebridge International Insurance Ltd to create and market a range of personal insurance products, providing accident, health and unemployment cover to its own customers and via business partners.

In 1999 it acquired the life assurance business of Guardian Royal Exchange. That year it also bought Transamerica Corporation.

On August 13, 2007, Aegon and Merrill Lynch announced a strategic business partnership in the areas of life insurance and investment products. As part of the relationship, Aegon acquired two of Merrill Lynch's life insurance companies for US$1.3 billion.

On April 23, 2008, Alex Wynaendts succeeded the retiring Donald J. Shepard as chairman of the executive board and CEO of Aegon N.V. following the group's annual general meeting of shareholders: Donald Shepard announced his retirement in November 2007, after six years as chairman.

On October 28, 2008, the Dutch government and De Nederlandsche Bank agreed to give Aegon a €3 billion capital injection to create a capital buffer in exchange for convertible bonds to ease the group through the financial crisis. On June 15, 2011, Aegon fulfilled its key objective of repurchasing all of the €3 billion core capital securities issued to the Dutch State. The total amount Aegon has paid to the Dutch State amounts to €4.1 billion. Of this amount, €3 billion covered the original issue of core capital securities, while an additional €1.1 billion was paid in premium and interest.

On August 3, 2011, Aegon USA announced that all its various businesses will be grouped under a single brand name: Transamerica. Transamerica's key businesses are life insurance, investments and retirement. The group includes companies whose history goes back over 100 years and whose products and services have become well known throughout the US, including founding companies Life Investors Insurance Company of America and Monumental Life Insurance Company.

In June 2018 AEGON was criticized by environmental organizations for its investments in oil sand companies and pipelines. Aegon reacted by stating that it was developing a new policy with regards to the oil and gas sector. In 2019, they decided to discontinue their oil sand investments.

On 15 May 2020, Lard Friese (former CEO of NN Group) succeeded Alex Wynaendts as the CEO of Aegon N.V..

Operations
Aegon's businesses focus on life insurance and pensions, savings and asset management products. The group is also active in accident and supplemental health insurance and general insurance, and has limited banking activities. Aegon has major operations in the United States (where it is heavily represented through World Financial Group and Transamerica), the Netherlands and the United Kingdom. In addition, the group is present in a number of other countries including Canada, Brazil, Mexico, Hungary, Poland, Romania, Slovakia, Czech Republic, Turkey, Spain, China, Japan, North America and India.

Aegon's world headquarters are in The Hague, Netherlands

Subsidiaries and divisions

North America
 Aegon USA, LLC
 Transamerica Corporation
 World Financial Group US Inc.

Netherlands
 Aegon Levensverzekering
 Aegon Schadeverzekering
 Aegon Bank
 OPTAS Pensioenen
 Aegon Spaarkas
 Unirobe Meeus Groep
 TKP Pensioen
 Aegon Hypotheken

United Kingdom
 Scottish Equitable plc (trading as Aegon UK)
 Origen Financial Services
 Positive Solutions
 Cofunds

Other
 Aegon España S.A. (Spain)
 Aegon Magyarország Általános Biztositó Zrt. (Hungary)
 Aegon TU na Życie S.A. / Aegon Powszechne Towarzystwo Emerytalne S.A. (Poland)

Joint ventures
 Aegon-CNOOC Life Insurance Company (50% joint venture with CNOOC) (China)
 Aegon Sony Life Insurance Cy (50% joint venture with Sony) (Japan)
 Aegon Industrial Fund Management Co. (49%) (China)
 AMVEST Vastgoed B.V. (Netherlands)

Shareholdings
 N.V. Levensverzekeringsmaatschappij "De Hoop" (33.3%) (Netherlands)
 Tenet Group Limited (22%) (United Kingdom)
 Seguros Argos (89%) (Mexico)
 Aegon Life Insurance Company Ltd (49%) (India)
 Mongeral Aegon (50%) (Brazil)

Banking services
AEGON also operates a direct bank under the brand name "Knab" in the Netherlands.  Soon after it was founded in 2012 the bank came under criticism for having the highest cost for any transaction account compared to other Dutch banks. Knab responded by saying that other banks hid many of its costs in other products.

Sponsorships
In 2008, Aegon became the official sponsor of the Dutch football team AFC Ajax, in a deal which lasted for seven years. Ajax's uniform featured the Aegon logo across the chest. Aegon became the third sponsor of Ajax (TDK sponsored Ajax since 1982 until 1991, and ABN AMRO sponsored the team from 1991 till 2008). As of late 2008, Aegon also sponsor the Lawn Tennis Association. A sponsorship package was agreed with the LTA and Aegon's name will appear on all four pillars of British Tennis, including many professional tournaments, one of which is the AEGON Championships, an ATP grasscourt professional tennis tournament in June in London, taking over from Stella Artois, who had sponsored the event since 1979. Since 2004, Transamerica has been the primary sponsor of the American golfer Zach Johnson. AEGON is one of the strategic industry partners with Duisenberg school of finance.

Headquarters office
The headquarters office of Aegon is located in The Hague and designed by OTH Architects. Initially AEGON wanted to redesign only the conference rooms, but while working on it they decided to improve and redesign the full building. The office spaces, the main hall and the restaurant were redesigned. The new design has a lot of glass like glass walls manufactured by SI-X. The restaurant has a main helical staircase with a full glass balustrade manufactured by Eestairs and did win the prize for the best staircase of the year in 2008. In 2009 Aegon decided to buy this building from real estate fund Unibail-Rodamco and keep the building as their headquarters.

References

External links

 
 

Insurance companies of the Netherlands
Multinational companies headquartered in the Netherlands
Financial services companies established in 1983
Dutch brands
Companies based in The Hague
Companies listed on Euronext Amsterdam
Dutch companies established in 1983